Spinout is a video game developed by UK-based developer Icon Games. It was released on PlayStation Portable in 2008. It is an arcade-style racing game where the player races in a spherical object, called a Xorb (the idea is derived from the real-life sport of zorbing). The 54 tracks raced on are set high above the ground, in 9 different environments. Features include 4 person multiplayer, Xorb customisation, and unlockable rewards. The game was also released on the PlayStation 2 under the title Realplay Puzzlesphere, which came with a bespoke controller.

External links
Spinout (PSP) at IGN.com

2008 video games
Ghostlight games
Marble games
Multiplayer and single-player video games
PlayStation 2 games
PlayStation Portable games
Racing video games
Video games developed in the United Kingdom